Andrew Polec (born 28 January 1989) is an actor on both stage and TV, singer and songwriter, best known for originating the role of Strat in Jim Steinman's Bat Out Of Hell: The Musical from 2016 to 2019, right from the show's workshop through performing in the UK and North America. He is the son of 6ABC reporter Don Polec.

Career

Theatre 

Note: In 2018, Polec left the London West End cast of the show, only to join the International Touring Cast of the same show. The 2018 Toronto run was originally intended as a tour of North America, but this tour was halted by the show's producers after the first venue.

Discography 

Polec's recording debut was as a member of the University of Rochester's a cappella ensemble - the Midnight Ramblers - on their album Ben Folds Presents: University A Cappella!, in 2009. In 2012, he released the album Welcome to Khat House as the lead singer of the band Khat House. The cast recording for Bat Out Of Hell: The Musical, released in 2017, features several songs which he sings in his lead role as Strat. He appears on the season 1 soundtrack of the Katy Keene TV series, alongside Ashleigh Murray, singing City Of Lights.

Television 

In 2017 - 2018, Polec performed on various TV shows with the cast of Bat Out Of Hell The Musical, including Tonight at the London Palladium, Britain's Got Talent and This Morning in the UK, and the Today show in the US.

In 2020 - 2021, he acted in two US TV dramas; Katy Keene and Prodigal Son.

Awards and nominations 

Polec won "Best West End Debut" at the inaugural Stage Debut Awards in 2017 for his role as Strat in Bat Out Of Hell The Musical.  For this same role, he was also nominated WhatsOnStage Award for Best Actor In A Musical in 2018, shortlisted for Best Actor in a New Production of a Musical in the BroadwayWorld UK's awards, and nominated "Rising Star" in the 2017 West End Wilma Awards.

Polec won the Kurt Weill Foundation for Music's 23rd Annual Lotte Lenya Competition in 2021.

References 

1989 births
Living people